Ghassan Salhab (Arabic; غسان سلهب, born 4 May 1958) is a Lebanese screenwriter and film director born in Dakar, Senegal. In addition to making his own films, he collaborates on various scenarios and teaches film in Lebanon. He has directed six feature films; Beyrouth Fantôme, Terra Incognita, The Last Man, 1958, The Mountain and The Valley. His films have been selected in various international film festivals. He has finished the shooting of The River, in addition to numerous “essays” and different “video works” including "Posthumous," "Chinese Ink," "Son Image," and Le voyage Immobile," on which he collaborated with Lebanese documentary filmmaker Mohamed Soueid. 

In 2016, he was a DAAD (Berlin) guest-resident. La Rochelle International Film Festival, JC Carthage and La Cinémathèque du Québec made a tribute to his work. He has also published different texts and articles in various magazines and a book, “fragments du Livre du naufrage”.

Filmography

Feature films

Other works

Publications
Fragments du livre du naufrage, Amers Editions, 2011

Exhibitions

Group exhibitions
 Beirut Lab: 1975(2020) Curated by Juli Carson and Yassmeen Tukan, University Art Gallery, University of California, Irvine, 2019

References

External links 
 Ghassan Salhab's Official Website
 

Lebanese film directors
Lebanese filmmakers
1958 births
Living people
People from Dakar
Lebanese film producers